Saunders Lewis (born John Saunders Lewis; 15 October 1893 – 1 September 1985) was a Welsh politician, poet, dramatist, Medievalist, and literary critic. He was a prominent Welsh nationalist, supporter of Welsh independence and was a co-founder of Plaid Genedlaethol Cymru (The National Party of Wales), later known as Plaid Cymru. Lewis is usually acknowledged as one of the most prominent figures of 20th century Welsh literature. In 1970, Lewis was nominated for a Nobel Prize in Literature. Lewis was voted the tenth greatest Welsh hero in the '100 Welsh Heroes' poll, released on St. David's Day 2004.

Early life
John Saunders Lewis was born into a Welsh family living in Wallasey in the Wirral, Cheshire, in the north-west of England, on 15 October 1893. He was the second of three sons of Lodwig Lewis (1859–1933), a Calvinistic Methodist minister, and his wife Mary Margaret (née Thomas, 1862–1900). Lewis attended Liscard High School for Boys and went on to study English and French at Liverpool University.

First World War
When the First World War broke out, Lewis enlisted as a volunteer with the King's Liverpool Regiment in September 1914, and in April 1915 applied for a commission with the South Wales Borderers and was promoted to full lieutenant in February 1916. He served in France and was wounded in the Battle of Cambrai.

During the war, Lewis read the series of novels The Cult of the Self (French: Le Culte du moi) by the French writer Maurice Barrès. Barrès, a French nationalist, heavily influenced Lewis' own Welsh nationalism. Furthermore, according to Jelle Krol, Lewis, "discovered the importance of his Welsh roots during his service in France."

Return to Wales 
After his return from the trenches, Lewis entered the literary field by arguing that three conditions needed to be met for Welsh literature to become truly meaningful. Firstly, "a more professional attitude to Welsh drama". Secondly, the reestablishment of a direct link between Welsh culture with that of mainland Europe, and particularly with French culture, and, lastly, a more continual religious and cultural exploration of pre-Reformation Wales by Welsh writers and intellectuals.

In 1922, he was appointed as lecturer in Welsh literature at the University College of Wales, Swansea. He continued in this post until his dismissal for a political act of arson at Penyberth, Gwynedd, in 1936.

Founding Plaid Cymru
Discussions of the need for a "Welsh party" had been conducted since the 19th century. With the generation or so before 1922 there "had been a marked growth in the constitutional recognition of the Welsh nation", wrote historian John Davies. By 1924 there were people in Wales "eager to make their nationality the focus of Welsh politics". Lewis's experiences in World War I, and his sympathy for the cause of Irish independence, brought him to Welsh nationalism.  He was an advocate for Welsh independence

In 1924, Lewis founded  ("The Welsh Movement") with a small group of fellow nationalists. The group met secretly for the first time in Penarth on 7 January 1924. The group continued to meet in secret throughout 1924 and began drawing up a set of aims and policies intended to "rescue Wales from political and cultural oblivion".

At around the same time as Lewis formed , another group of nationalists formed  ("The Welsh Home Rule Army") in Caernarfon. The group was led by Huw Robert Jones, who made contact with Lewis in early 1925 and proposed to form a new political party. 

Lewis met with Jones, Lewis Valentine, Moses Griffith, Fred Jones and D. Edmund Williams in a café called Maes Gwyn during the 1925 National Eisteddfod in Pwllheli, Gwynedd, with the aim of establishing a "Welsh party". They founded  ("National Party of Wales"), on 5 August 1925. The principal aim of the party would be to foster a Welsh speaking Wales. To this end it was agreed that party business be conducted in Welsh, and that members sever all links with other British parties. Lewis insisted on these principles before he would agree to the Pwllheli conference.

According to the 1911 census, out of a population of just under 2.5 million, 43.5% of the total population of Wales spoke Welsh as a primary language. This was a decrease from the 1891 census with 54.4% speaking Welsh out of a population of 1.5 million. With these pre-requisites, Lewis condemned Welsh nationalism' as it had hitherto existed, a nationalism characterized by inter-party conferences, an obsession with Westminster and a willingness to accept a subservient position for the Welsh language", wrote Davies. It may be because of these strict positions that the party failed to attract politicians of experience in its early years. However, the party's members believed its founding was an achievement in itself; "merely by existing, the party was a declaration of the distinctiveness of Wales", wrote Davies.

The Lewis Doctrine 1926–1939
During the inter-war years, Plaid Genedlaethol Cymru was most successful as a social and educational pressure group rather than as a political party. For Saunders Lewis, party president 1926 to 1939, "the chief aim of the party [is] to 'take away from the Welsh their sense of inferiority ... to remove from our beloved country the mark and shame of conquest. Lewis sought to cast Welshness into a new context, wrote Davies.

Lewis wished to demonstrate how Welsh heritage was linked as one of the 'founders' of European civilization. Lewis, a self-described "strong monarchist", wrote "Civilization is more than an abstraction. It must have a local habitation and name. Here its name is Wales." Additionally, Lewis strove for the stability, educational and cultural advancement, and economic prosperity of local communities in Y Fro Gymraeg. He also denounced both laissez faire capitalism and Marxism, and instead promoted what he called : (lit. "[[distributing property among the masses"), based on the traditional ideologies of both Distributism and Christian democracy.

Broadcasting

Saunders Lewis perceived the early development of BBC radio broadcasting in Wales (which was almost entirely in English) as serious threat to his aim of arresting the decline of the Welsh language (then down to 36%) and turning Wales back into a 100% Welsh-speaking nation. At the same time he also recognised that if he could exert influence and pressure on the BBC, the Corporation could become a useful tool to serve Plaid Cymru's political ends. In 1929 he declared it would soon be necessary to arrange for "thousands of Welshmen to be prosecuted for refusing to pay for English programmes". The following year Lewis was commissioned by E.R. Appleton, Director of the BBC's Cardiff radio station, (who had banned broadcasting in Welsh) to broadcast a talk which would "explain Welsh Nationalism". On vetting the script, which advocated political nationalism in preference to "cultural nationalism", Appleton decided it was too controversial and inflammatory to be broadcast. In October 1933 the University of Wales Council, which had been lobbying for more Welsh-language broadcasting, appointed a ten-man council to press the case with the BBC. It included David Lloyd George, William George, W. J. Gruffydd and Saunders Lewis – who was continuing to incense the BBC by publicly alleging it was "seeking the destruction of the Welsh language". The University Committee, which was described by BBC Director General John Reith as "the most unpleasant and unreliable people with whom it has been my misfortune to deal" gained ever more influence on the BBC in Wales not least in the selection of BBC staff – a function delegated to the committee by the corporation. As newspapers of the time noted, appointees seemed primarily drawn from the families of the Welsh-speaking elite including "the son of a professor of Welsh and the offspring of three archdruids". Saunders Lewis's assiduous campaigning over the years was to succeed in cementing an ongoing Plaid Cymru influence within the BBC. When the BBC's Welsh Advisory Council was eventually established in 1946, although half its members were Labour, several Plaid Cymru supporters were appointed including Saunders Lewis's successor as Plaid Cymru president, Gwynfor Evans.

1936

Welsh nationalism was ignited in 1936 when the UK Government settled on establishing an RAF training camp and aerodrome at Penyberth on the Llŷn Peninsula in Gwynedd. The UK Government settled on Llŷn as the site for its training camp after similar proposed sites in Northumberland and Dorset met with protests.

However, UK Prime Minister Stanley Baldwin refused to hear the case against building this 'bombing school' in Wales, despite a deputation representing 500,000 Welsh protesters. Protest against the project was summed up by Lewis when he wrote that the UK Government was intent upon turning one of the "essential homes of Welsh culture, idiom, and literature" into a place for promoting a barbaric method of warfare. Construction of this military academy began exactly 400 years after the first Act of Union annexing Wales into England.

On 8 September 1936, the building was set on fire and in the investigations which followed Saunders Lewis, Lewis Valentine, and D. J. Williams claimed responsibility. They were tried at Caernarfon, where the jury failed to agree on a verdict. The case was then sent to be retried at the Old Bailey in London, where the "Three" were convicted, and sentenced to nine months imprisonment. On their release from Wormwood Scrubs, they were greeted as heroes by 15,000 Welsh people at a pavilion in Caernarfon.

Many Welsh people were angered by the judge's scornful treatment of the Welsh language, by the decision to move the trial to London, and by the decision of University College, Swansea, to dismiss Lewis from his post before he had been found guilty. Dafydd Glyn Jones wrote of the fire that it was "the first time in five centuries that Wales struck back at England with a measure of violence... To the Welsh people, who had long ceased to believe that they had it in them, it was a profound shock."

In 1939 Lewis resigned as  president, saying that Wales was not ready to accept the leadership of a Roman Catholic.

Lewis was the son and grandson of prominent Welsh Calvinistic Methodist ministers. In 1932, he had converted to Roman Catholicism.

Second World War
It was his attempt at an unbiased interpretation of the causes and events of the war.

Outside of the party's initial position on the war, party members were free to choose for themselves their level of support for the war effort.  was officially neutral regarding involvement the Second World War, which Lewis and other leaders considered a continuation of the First World War. Central to the neutrality policy was the idea that Wales, as a nation, had the right to decide independently on its attitude towards war, and the rejection of other nations to force Welshmen to serve in their armed forces. With this challenging and revolutionary policy Lewis hoped a significant number of Welshmen would refuse to join the British Army.

Lewis and other party members were attempting to strengthen loyalty to the Welsh nation "over the loyalty to the British State". Lewis argued "The only proof that the Welsh nation exists is that there are some who act as if it did exist."

However, most party members who claimed conscientious objection status did so in the context of their moral and religious beliefs, rather than on political policy. Of these almost all were exempt from military service. About 24 party members made politics their sole grounds for exemption, of whom 12 received prison sentences. For Lewis, those who objected proved that the assimilation of Wales was "being withstood, even under the most extreme pressures".

University of Wales by-election, 1943
Prior to 1950, universities could elect and return representatives to the House of Commons. The University of Wales seat had become vacant when the constituency's Liberal Member of Parliament, Ernest Evans, had been appointed a county court judge in 1942. Lewis was selected to contest the seat for Plaid Cymru in the ensuing 1943 University of Wales by-election.

His opponent was former Plaid Genedlaethol Cymru Deputy Vice-president Dr William John Gruffydd. Gruffydd had been voicing doubts about Lewis's ideas since 1933, and by 1943 he had left Plaid Cymru and joined the Liberal Party. His other opponent, independent candidate Alun Talfan Davies, was another former member of Plaid Genedlaethol Cymru who would later become Chairman of the Welsh Liberal Party.

The "brilliant but wayward" Gruffydd was a favorite with Welsh-speaking intellectuals and drew 52.3% of the vote, to Lewis's 22.5%.

The election effectively split the Welsh-speaking intelligentsia, and left Lewis embittered with politics, leading him to retreat from direct political involvement. However the experience proved invaluable for Plaid Cymru, as "for the first time they were taken seriously as a political force." The by-election campaign led directly to "considerable growth" in the party's membership.

and the 1961 census
In 1962 Lewis gave a radio speech entitled  ("The Fate of the Language") in which he predicted the complete extinction of the Welsh language by 2000 unless immediate action was taken.

Lewis's radio speech was in response to the 1961 census, which showed a decrease in the percentage of Welsh speakers from 36% in 1931 to 26%, of the population of about 2.5 million. In the census the counties of Meirionnydd (Merionethshire), Ynys Môn (Anglesey), Caerfyrddin (Carmarthenshire), and Caernarfon (Caernarvonshire) averaged a 75% proportion of Welsh speakers, with the most significant decreases in the counties of Glamorgan, Flint, and Pembroke.

Assuming, "a gloomy sepulchral tone", Lewis argued that the Welsh language was, "driven into a corner, ready to be thrown, like a worthless rag, on the dung heap." The responsibility for this lay, according to Lewis, less in the hands of the British civil service bureaucracy than with the timidity and indifference of the Welsh-speaking people themselves. As he had fully intended it to do, Lewis' lecture immediately touched a raw nerve.

While Lewis' had wished to shame Plaid Cymru into more direct action promoting a Welsh language revival, his speech instead led to the formation of Cymdeithas yr Iaith Gymraeg (Welsh Language Society) later that year at a Plaid Cymru summer school held in Pontardawe in Glamorgan. The foundation of  allowed Plaid Cymru to focus on electoral politics, while the Cymdeithas launched a campaign of civil disobedience aimed at the State's policy of coercive Anglicisation.

According to Marcus Tanner, "For the first time, the British government was forced to recognise the existence of a substantial non-Anglophone culture, and to rethink attitudes that had been set in stone since Henry VIII's so-called Acts of Union. The new, more conciliatory attitude began under Labour, but continued under the Conservatives."

Responding to escalating demands for devolution in the United Kingdom, in 1964 the Labour Government established the Welsh Office and the post of Secretary of State for Wales. The Welsh Language Bill of 1967 granted Welsh equal status to English in the legal system. Further legislation belatedly granted century-old demands for Welsh-medium education.

Nobel nominee
In 1970, Lewis was nominated for the Nobel Prize in Literature. His literary works include plays, poetry, novels and essays. He wrote mostly in Welsh, but he also wrote some works in English. By the time of his death in 1985 some rated him as amongst the most celebrated of Welsh writers.

Literary activity
Lewis was above all a dramatist. His notable plays include  (The woman of flowers) (1923–25, revised 1948),  (The life of Germanus) (radio play, 1936),  (1956),  (Will you have a cigarette?) He also translated Samuel Beckett's  from French into Welsh. His plays drew upon a wide range of material and covered a range of subject matter including Welsh mythology and history, as well as the Christian Bible, although he also wrote plays set in contemporary Wales.

Lewis' use of poetic forms in the Welsh language included both the use of traditional strict metre forms in cynghanedd such as cywyddau and awdlau as well as the Sicilian School's sonnet form, "a variety of other rhyming stanzas", and "full breathed free verse", which were derived from poetry in other languages.

Following his conversion to the Catholic Church, Lewis also wrote many works of Christian poetry inspired by his new faith. These included poems about the Real Presence in the Blessed Sacrament, a poem that sympathetically describes St. Joseph's crisis of faith, about the traumatic but purgatorial sense of loss experienced by St. Mary Magdalen after the Crucifixion of Jesus Christ, and about attending the Tridentine Mass on Christmas Day.

Lewis wrote the libretto for Arwel Hughes's opera  (Love's the doctor), based on Molière's  (first performance 1960 by Welsh National Opera).

Honorary doctorate and demand for Latin mass
In March 1983, at the age of 89, Saunders Lewis was made an honorary Doctor of Letters of the University of Wales at a ceremony specially conducted at his home in Penarth. The Catholic Herald, reporting the honour, noted that in the previous year Lewis had made a plea for Mass to be said in Latin in Wales rather than in the "foreign language of English", which he pointed out was "a later arrival".

Legacy
Lewis's legacy remains a controversial one. His enthusiasm for Medieval studies and for both the history and the revival of the Catholic Church in Wales, his decidedly un-Marxist interpretation of Welsh history, and his beliefs that language revival, Christian democracy, and an Irish-style Land War were preferable causes for the Welsh nationalist movement to embrace than Socialism have all attracted considerable criticism, both during Lewis' lifetime and since his death.

For example, historian John Davies writes that, "in a notable article", Saunders Lewis argued that the Welsh bards of the Medieval era, "were expressing in their poetry a love for a stable, deep-rooted civilization." Lewis added that the bards "were the leading upholders of the belief that a hierarchical social structure, 'the heritage and tradition of an ancient aristocracy', were the necessary precondition of civilized life and that there were deep philosophical roots to this belief."

By arguing, however, that there was more to the praise poetry composed by Medieval Welsh bards in honour of the not yet Anglicised Welsh nobility than mere insincere flattery, Lewis received accusations from Welsh Leftists of having "elitist" views.

Furthermore, Lewis' critical and allegedly "condescending attitude towards some aspects of the Nonconformist, radical and pacifist traditions of Wales", also drew extremely harsh criticism from fellow Welsh nationalists such as D. J. Davies, a Marxist Plaid Cymru member. Davies argued in favour of engaging English-speaking Welsh communities, and stressed the territorial integrity of Wales. Davies also pointed towards Left Wing political parties in Scandinavian countries as a model for Plaid Cymru to emulate, and was accordingly far more interested in the "economic implications" of Welsh self-government.

Left wing historian Geraint H. Jenkins has written:- "..Lewis was a cold fish. His reedy voice, bow tie, cerebral style and aristocratic contempt for the proletariat were hardly endearing qualities in a political leader, and his conversion to Catholicism lost him the sympathy of fervent Nonconformists. Heavily influenced by the discourse of right-wing French theorists, this profoundly authoritarian figure developed a grand strategy, such as it was, based on the deindustrialization of Wales. Such a scheme was both impractical and unpopular. It caused grave embarrassment to his socialist colleague D. J. Davies, a progressive economist who, writing with force and passion, showed a much better grasp of the economic realities of the time and greater sensitivity towards the plight of working people.

During the post-World War II battles between Plaid Cymru and the Labour Party over political control of South Wales, a hostile 1946 portrait mocked Saunders Lewis for thinking himself to be the "Masaryk of Wales" and that both the United Kingdom and the very concept of Britishness would one day to collapse similarly to the Austro-Hungarian Empire in 1918. The same writer then sarcastically feigned sympathy for Plaid Cymru, a political party which was allegedly burdened by, "bitterness and hate and the (possibly unintentional) air of physical superiority with which only too many of its members have regarded the bulk of their countrymen."

During the 1990s, in the midst of a debate over the Government of Wales Act 1998, Saunders Lewis was also accused in the House of Commons of having praised Adolf Hitler in 1936 with the words, "At once he fulfilled his promise — a promise which was greatly mocked by the London papers months before that — to completely abolish the financial strength of the Jews in the economic life of Germany."

In 2001, former Plaid Cymru President Dafydd Elis-Thomas accused Saunders Lewis during a television documentary of being, "lousy as a politician, lousy as a writer, but a good Catholic".

In contrast, however, Marcus Tanner, while researching in his 2004 book The Last of the Celts visited the decaying English-speaking Welsh industrial towns, which D.J. Davies once saw as Plaid Cyrmu's future. Pointing out that they were dominated for decades by Far Left political machines, leading to Soviet-inspired concrete architecture, political corruption, and skyrocketing unemployment, Tanner compared South Wales to the many other similarly decaying and disillusioned industrial towns behind the former Iron Curtain after the collapse of the Soviet Union.

In the same book, Tanner credited the famous 1961 radio lecture by Saunders Lewis with being the primary reason why the Welsh language was, as of 2004, the only one of the Celtic languages that was neither dead or critically endangered. 

Lewis' legacy is also reflected by the fact that, even in traditionally English-speaking Welsh colliery and industrial cities, Welsh-medium education is increasingly used as a means of both cultural and language revival. 

For this and many other reasons, Saunders Lewis was overwhelmingly voted by the Welsh people as their 10th greatest national hero in the '100 Welsh Heroes' poll, the results of which was released on St. David's Day, 2004.

Further reading

Lewis, Saunders (1985–2002), The Plays of Saunders Lewis, 4 vols, translated by Joseph P. Clancy.
Lewis, Saunders (1993), Selected Poems, translated by Joseph P. Clancy. Cardiff: University of Wales Press. .

Electoral record
Lewis contested the University of Wales Constituency on two occasions, once in the General election of 1931;

and again in the University of Wales by-election of 1943.

References

Sources 

Griffiths, Bruce (1989), Saunders Lewis. Writers of Wales series. Cardiff: University of Wales Press. .
Jones, Alun R. & Gwyn Thomas (Eds.) (1973), Presenting Saunders Lewis. Cardiff: University of Wales Press. .
Jones, Harri Pritchard (1991), Saunders Lewis: A Presentation of His Work. Illinois: Templegate. .
 'Lewis, Saunders (1893–1985)'. In Meic Stephens (Ed.) (1998), The New Companion to the Literature of Wales. Cardiff: University of Wales Press. .
Chapman, T. Robin (2006), Un Bywyd o Blith Nifer: Cofiant Saunders Lewis. Llandysul: Gomer.  (in Welsh; the only complete biography).

Bibliography

External links
Saunders Lewis and the "Tynged yr iaith" ("The fate of the Welsh language") lecture from the National Library of Wales website 
Saunders Lewis, 'The Banned Wireless Talk on Welsh Nationalism' (Caernarfon, 1930) from the Gathering the Jewels website.
Paham y Llosgasom yr Ysgol Fomio (Why we Burnt the Bombing School) by Saunders Lewis and Lewis Valentine (1936, Plaid Cenedlaethol Cymru, Caernarfon): their speeches to the jury at the Caernarfon Assizes (in Welsh).   
  Review of Lewis's book Williams Pantycelyn

1893 births
1985 deaths
20th-century Welsh dramatists and playwrights
20th-century Welsh historians
20th-century male writers
20th-century Welsh writers
Anti-English sentiment
British Army personnel of World War I
British Christian democrats
British modernist poets
Converts to Roman Catholicism from Methodism
Distributism
Formalist poets
Historians of Wales
King's Regiment (Liverpool) soldiers
Leaders of Plaid Cymru
Military personnel from Merseyside
Plaid Cymru politicians
People from Wallasey
Sonneteers
South Wales Borderers officers
Traditionalist Catholic writers
Welsh Catholic poets
Welsh-language poets
Welsh-language writers
Welsh literary critics
Welsh nationalists
Welsh people of World War I
Welsh politicians
Welsh Roman Catholics
Welsh World War I poets